Wild Blessed Freedom is the second studio album by Swedish-American alternative rock band Carolina Liar. It was released on September 27, 2011.

History
On July 12, the band made the first single off the album, Drown, available through the iTunes Store. On July 18, the band released the music video for the song and preorders for the album were made available on July 20.

Track listing

Personnel
 Chad Wolf - lead vocals, guitar
 Rickard Göransson  -  guitar
 Johan Carlsson - keyboards
 Peter Carlsson - drums, percussion
 Erik Hääger - bass

References

2011 albums
Carolina Liar albums
Albums produced by Max Martin
Albums produced by Shellback (record producer)